Sawley may refer to:

Places
Sawley, Derbyshire
Sawley railway station, Breaston, Derbyshire
Sawley, Lancashire, in the West Riding of Yorkshire until 1974
Sawley Abbey, Sawley, Lancashire, England
Sawley, North Yorkshire, in the West Riding of Yorkshire until 1974

People
Albert Sawley (1915–1983), Australian rules footballer 
Alfred Sawley, English footballer 
George Sawley (1904–1967), set decorator and art director
Gordon Sawley (1913–1942), Australian rules footballer
Stephen of Sawley (died 1252), Cistercian monk

See also
Saufley (disambiguation)